Antonio Lascuña (born 26 December 1970) is a Filipino professional golfer.

Lascuña turned professional in 1997. After great success in his home country he joined the Asian Tour in 2007. Since then he has retained his card comfortably every season, with runner-up finishes in the 2007 Iskandar Johor Open and the 2012 Mercuries Taiwan Masters. His best season to date has been 2012, when he finished 12th on the Order of Merit.

Lascuña also represented his country in the 2007 World Cup, alongside Gerald Rosales.

Amateur wins
1992 Canlubang Open
1993 Philippine Amateur
1994 DHL Amateur Open
1996 Putra Cup

Professional wins (27)

Asian Development Tour wins (1)

1Co-sanctioned by the Philippine Golf Tour

ASEAN PGA Tour wins (1)

Philippine Golf Tour wins (23)

1Co-sanctioned by the Asian Development Tour

PGT Asia wins (2)

1Co-sanctioned by the Taiwan PGA Tour

Other wins (1)
2007 Petaling Jaya Classic

Playoff record
Asian Tour playoff record (0–1)

Results in World Golf Championships

"T" = Tied

Team appearances
Amateur
Eisenhower Trophy (representing the Philippines): 1996

Professional
World Cup (representing the Philippines): 2007, 2013

References

External links

Filipino male golfers
Asian Tour golfers
Golfers at the 1994 Asian Games
Asian Games competitors for the Philippines
Sportspeople from Manila
1970 births
Living people